The Virtual Boy is a 32-bit tabletop video game console developed and designed by Nintendo, first released in Japan on July 21, 1995 and later in North America on August 14 of the same year. The following lists contains all of the games released for the Virtual Boy.

Originally unveiled at Nintendo's Shoshinkai Show in Japan on November 15, 1994 and at Winter CES in North America on January 6, 1995, it was never intended to be released in its final form but Nintendo pushed the Virtual Boy in its unfinished state to market so that it could focus development resources on the then-upcoming Nintendo 64 and arrived later than other 32-bit systems such as the 3DO Interactive Multiplayer, PlayStation and Sega Saturn but at a lower price, retailing at US$179.95 but in mid-1996, Blockbuster was selling Virtual Boy units at $50 each.

Several additional titles were announced to be released for the Virtual Boy at E3 1996, but ultimately they were never released due to the system’s discontinuation by Nintendo themselves, as were several localizations that were only released in one region. The system was never released in other markets.

Games 
Listed here are all 22 officially released Virtual Boy games. Of these, eight titles were exclusive to Japan and three to North America. North America and other NTSC territories saw 14 releases and Japan, Hong Kong and other NTSC-J territories had 19. A number of games were either announced or already in development before ultimately being cancelled including Bound High!, Dragon Hopper, and Zero Racers.

See also 
 Lists of video games

Notes

References

External links 
 List of Virtual Boy games at MobyGames

Nintendo-related lists
Video game lists by platform